Noelia Ramos Álvarez (born 10 February 1999) is a Spanish footballer who plays as a goalkeeper for Sevilla.

Club career
Ramos started her career at Granadilla.

Personal life
Ramos has a twin sister, Natalia; they played together at Granadilla and Levante before going their separate ways.

References

External links
Profile at La Liga

1999 births
Living people
Women's association football goalkeepers
Spanish women's footballers
People from San Cristóbal de La Laguna
Sportspeople from the Province of Santa Cruz de Tenerife
Footballers from the Canary Islands
UD Granadilla Tenerife players
Levante UD Femenino players
Sevilla FC (women) players
Primera División (women) players
Twin sportspeople
Spanish twins
Spain women's youth international footballers